Fisher Phillips, LLP is one of the largest U.S. law firms representing management exclusively in the areas of labor, employment, civil rights, employee benefits, and immigration law. The firm has 36 offices with more than 400 attorneys. The firm’s headquarters are in Atlanta, with offices in Baltimore, Boston, Charlotte, Chicago, Cleveland, Columbia, Columbus, Dallas, Denver, Detroit, Fort Lauderdale, Gulfport, Houston, Irvine, Kansas City, Las Vegas, Los Angeles, Louisville, Nashville, New Jersey, New Orleans, New York, Orlando, Philadelphia, Phoenix, Pittsburgh, Portland, Sacramento, San Diego, San Francisco, Seattle, Tampa, Washington, D.C. Metro, and Woodland Hills.

The firm was founded in 1943 in Atlanta by I. Walter "Ike" Fisher.  Erle Phillips joined Mr. Fisher in 1949. The firm was one of the first in the U.S. to focus its practice on representing employers in labor and employment matters.

Practice Areas
The Firm has several practice areas: Employee Benefits; Employee Leaves; Employment Discrimination and Harassment; Global Immigration; Labor Relations; Litigation of Employment Disputes; Mergers, Acquisitions and Downsizing; Occupational Safety and Health; Preventive Services; Trade Secrets and Unfair Competition; Wage and Hour Law.

Practice Groups
The firm has several practice groups: Automobile Dealership; Education; Employee Benefits; Employee Defection and Trade Secrets; Government Affairs; Healthcare; Hospitality Industry; Retail Industry.

External links
Official website
Firm blog

References
 http://www.bizjournals.com/denver/stories/2009/05/25/daily13.html
 http://www.chron.com/disp/story.mpl/hotstories/6478434.html
 http://www.ajc.com/metro/content/printedition/2009/02/15/atlfocus0215.html?cxntlid=inform_artr
 http://www.chambersandpartners.com/USA/Firms/65335-36457
 http://www.bestlawyers.com/firms/fisher-phillips-llp/23494/US
 http://www.martindale.com/Fisher-Phillips-LLP/law-firm-105212.htm

Law firms established in 1943
Law firms based in Atlanta